Aldo Pedrana (11 April 1934 – 16 October 2018) was an Italian skier. He competed in the Nordic combined event at the 1956 Winter Olympics.

References

External links
 

1934 births
2018 deaths
Italian male Nordic combined skiers
Olympic Nordic combined skiers of Italy
Nordic combined skiers at the 1956 Winter Olympics
Sportspeople from the Province of Sondrio